In forensic science, Locard's principle holds that the perpetrator of a crime will bring something into the crime scene and leave with something from it, and that both can be used as forensic evidence. Dr. Edmond Locard (1877–1966) was a pioneer in forensic science who became known as the Sherlock Holmes of Lyon, France. He formulated the basic principle of forensic science as: "Every contact leaves a trace". It is generally understood as "with contact between two items, there will be an exchange." Paul L. Kirk expressed the principle as follows:

Wherever he steps, whatever he touches, whatever he leaves, even unconsciously, will serve as a silent witness against him. Not only his fingerprints or his footprints, but his hair, the fibres from his clothes, the glass he breaks, the tool mark he leaves, the paint he scratches, the blood or semen he deposits or collects. All of these and more, bear mute witness against him. This is evidence that does not forget. It is not confused by the excitement of the moment. It is not absent because human witnesses are. It is factual evidence. Physical evidence cannot be wrong, it cannot perjure itself, it cannot be wholly absent. Only human failure to find it, study and understand it, can diminish its value.

Fragmentary or trace evidence is any type of material left at (or taken from) a crime scene, or the result of contact between two surfaces, such as shoes and the floor covering or soil, or fibres from where someone sat on an upholstered chair.

When a crime is committed, fragmentary (or trace) evidence needs to be collected from the scene. A team of specialised police technicians goes to the scene of the crime and seals it off. They record video and take photographs of the crime scene, victim/s (if there are any) and items of evidence. If necessary, they undertake ballistics examinations. They check for foot, shoe, and tire mark impressions, plus hair as well as examine any vehicles and check for fingerprints – whole or partial.

Famous cases

The case studies below show how prevalent Locard's Exchange Principle is in each and every crime. The examples using Locard's Principle show not only how the transfer of trace evidence can tell the tale of what happened, but also how much care is required when collecting and evaluating trace evidence.

The Weimar children murders

Karola and Melanie Weimar, aged 5 and 7, lived with their parents, Reinhard and Monika, in Germany. They were reported missing on 4 August 1986. Their bodies were found on 7 August. They had been murdered.

Monika first said the children had breakfast, then went to a playground. Three weeks later she said they were already dead when she returned home the previous night: Reinhard was sitting on the edge of Karola's bed, weeping and confused; he then disposed of the bodies.

Both parents were suspected, but Monika was having an affair, and was seen where Melanie's body was later found. She was convicted, and after serving her sentence, was released in 2006.

Investigators determined what clothes Monika was wearing on 3 and 4 August, but not Reinhard's clothes, so only fibres from her clothing were identified on the children's bodies, yet they were also constantly in contact with him.

The bedding contained 14 fibres from Karola's T-shirt. Frictionless tests, simulating a dead child, matched that figure better than the friction tests, simulating a live child, so Karola could have lain lifelessly in bed wearing her T-shirt, as stated by her mother.

35 fibres from Monika's blouse were found on the back of Melanie's T-shirt, but only one on her bed sheet. In tests, between 6 and 10 fibres remained on the sheet. These higher numbers were thought to disprove Monika's claim that she gave her child a goodbye hug the previous day. However, there are several likely explanations. For example, the bedding was put in one bag, so fibres from the sheet could have been transferred to the cover and pillow. Only the central area of the top of the sheet was taped: it might have originally contained more than one blouse fibre, the others could have been transferred to the back or sides while in the bag.

The blouse fibres on Melanie's clothing were distributed evenly, not the clusters expected from carrying the body.

265 fibres from the family car's rear seat covers were found on Melanie's panties and the inside of her trousers, but only a small number of fibres from the front seats was found on the children. This helped disprove the theory that they were killed on the front seats.

Melanie's clothes and hair were covered in 375 clinging fruits of goosegrass. As some of these itchy things were on the inside of her trousers and on her panties, the trousers must have been put on her after death.

No sand was found on the bodies or clothing (including socks and sandals) of either child, making the morning playground story unlikely.

The Westerfield-van Dam case 

Danielle van Dam, aged 7, lived with her parents and brothers in San Diego, California. She was reported missing on 2 February 2002; her body was discovered on 27 February. Neighbor David Westerfield was almost immediately suspected, as he had gone camping in his RV, and he was convicted of her kidnapping.

Hairs consistent with the van Dams' dog were found in his RV, also carpet fibres consistent with Danielle's bedroom carpet. Danielle's nightly ritual was to wrestle with the dog after getting into her pajamas. The prosecution argued that those hairs and fibres got onto her pajamas through that contact, and were then carried on the pajamas to first Westerfield's house and then to his RV, when he kidnapped her from her bed. The alternative scenario is that they got onto her daytime clothes, and those of her mother and younger brother, and were carried to his house when they visited him earlier that week selling cookies. He said his laundry was out during that visit, so trace evidence from them could have got on it, and then been transferred to his bedroom and his RV (secondary Locard transfer). Also, his RV was often parked, sometimes unlocked, in the neighbourhood streets, so Danielle could have sneaked inside, leaving behind that evidence.

No trace of Westerfield was found in the van Dam house.

14 hairs consistent with Danielle's were found in his environment. All but one were compared on only mitochondrial DNA, so they might have come from her mother or a sibling. Most (21) of the hairs were in a dryer lint ball in his trash can, so they might have got in his laundry before the kidnapping.

There were 5 carpet fibres in his RV, but none in his house, suggesting those were deposited by someone going directly from her house to his RV, or they may have come from another house in that development.

No Danielle pajama or bedding fibres were reported in his environment. There was no trace evidence in his SUV (which casts doubt on the belief that she was transported from his house to his RV in his SUV). He vacuumed his RV after the kidnapping, but no trace evidence was in the vacuum cleaner.

One orange fibre with her body was consistent with about 200 in his house and 20 in his SUV (none in his RV), while 21 blue fibres with her body were consistent with 10 in his house and 46 in his RV (none in his SUV). Contrary to media reports, only a few items from her house were tested so that can't be excluded as the source. In particular, the clothes of Danielle and her family during the cookie sale were not determined and eliminated. There were apparently two different types of the orange fibres, dull and very bright (so the number which matched might have been much less than 200). There were red fibres with her fingernails, and many other fibres with her body, which could not be matched to his environment. The only non-Danielle hair found with her body wasn't his, nor was any desert sand reported with the body, and no soil or vegetation from the dump site was reported on his shoes, laundry, shovel or RV.

To explain why so much expected evidence was missing, the prosecution argued that he went on a cleaning frenzy, and tossed out evidence.

Application in Information Security 
Locard's Principle also holds in computer forensics, where committing cyber crime will result in a digital trace being left behind.

References

External links
 Evidence Dynamics: Locard's Exchange Principle & Crime Reconstruction, W. J. Chisum, B. E. Turvey
 Fuller, John. (17 June 2008) "How Locard's Exchange Principle Works", HowStuffWorks.com.

Forensic science
Principles